Carlos Soria Fontán (Ávila, Spain, February 5, 1939) is a Spanish mountain climber who, at 80 years of age, has taken up the challenge of becoming the oldest person in the world to reach the summits of the 14 highest mountains in the world. He is the only mountaineer to have ascended ten mountains of more than 8,000 meters after turning 60, and he is the oldest person in history to have successfully climbed the K2 (65 years old), Broad Peak (68), Makalu (69), Gasherbrum I (70), Manaslu (71 years old),  Kanchenjunga (75 years old) and Annapurna (77 years old).

Beginnings 
Carlos Soria first became interested in mountaineering when, at the age of only 14, he set out to ascend the Sierra de Guadarrama (province of Madrid, Spain), accompanied by a friend, Antonio Riaño. That was the first of many climbs until at the age of 21 he moved up to a different category altogether: accompanied by another friend, in 1960 he rode a Vespa all the way to the Alps for his first high-difficult climbings.

In 1968, he was on the first Spanish expedition to Russia to climb Mount Elbrus, the highest mountain in Europe (5,642 meters), and in 1971 he went on an expedition to Alaska's Denali, at 6,194 meters the highest mountain peak in North America.

Ever since, Soria has been inextricably linked to the history of Spanish mountain climbing. In 1973 and 1975 he took part in the first Spanish expeditions to the Himalayas, witnessing Spain's first successful ascent of an eight-thousander, by Jerónimo López and Gerardo Blázquez. It was not until 1990, however, that he achieved his first 'eight-thousander' (Nanga Parbat), 17 years after his first attempt. As it turns out, in 2010 he first climbed Mount Manaslu, 37 years after his first attempt, which attests to his tenacity and determination to succeed.

Carlos Soria has undertaken most of his expeditions practically solo, assisted only by some sherpas and porters, in particular, Muktu Sherpa, who has accompanied him on six expeditions and four 8,000-meter ascents (K-2, Shisha Pagma, Manaslu and Lhotse). However, since July 2011, Soria has been supported by the Spanish bank BBVA, allowing him to face the last of his planned 14 'eight-thousanders' with greater guarantees and resources.
Carlos Soria has become a leading sports figure because of his achievement of extraordinary feats at an age when most persons of his generation are spectators. His 2004 ascent of the K2 (8,611 meters) at the age of 65—by comparison, the Austrian Kurt Diemberger accomplished this at the age of 54—and his 2008 solo ascent without oxygen of the Makalu (8,463 meters), have revolutionized mountaineering.

An example of values 
Carlos Soria's great contribution is that he has given a practical example of how even seniors can have full lives, both physically and mentally, which is an important inspiration for thousands of persons of all ages who regularly follow his expeditions.
Despite the passage of time and the changes in top-tier mountain climbing, Carlos Soria continues to eschew competitive mountaineering events. Soria is a frequent speaker at numerous forums and congresses, where he advocates enjoying nature and spreads his message of the importance of prudence and intelligently facing risks.
His local roots and personal simplicity add a human side to his adventures, further boosting his popularity in Spain. No other person in the world of his age is involved in a project to climb all 14 'eight-thousanders' on Earth. The mere fact that he is attempting this feat is putting elite mountaineering in the spotlight, not only from the standpoint of sports but also from the standpoint of science, given Soria's decades of cooperation with the Department of Sports Medicine of Spain's National Institute of Physical Education.

All his eight-thousanders

In chronological order 
 Nanga Parbat (8.125 m.), Pakistán, 1990
 Gasherbrum II (8.035 m.), China/Pakistan, 1994
 Cho Oyu (8.201 m.), China/Nepal, 1999
 Everest (8.848 m.), China/Nepal, 2001
 K2 (8.611 m.), China/Pakistan, 2004
 Broad Peak (8.047 m.), China/Pakistan, 2007
 Makalu (8.465 m.), China/Nepal, 2008
 Gasherbrum I (8.068 m.), China/Pakistan, 2009
 Manaslu (8.156 m.), Nepal, 2010
 Lhotse (8.516 m.), China/Nepal, 2011
 Kanchenjunga (8.586 m.), Nepal, 2014
 Annapurna (8.091 m.), Nepal, 2016

A life in sports 
 12 summits above 8,000 meters
 Oldest person in history to have climbed K2 (8,611 meters), Broad Peak (8,047 meters), Makalu (8,463 meters), Manaslu (8,163 meters), Lhotse (8,516 meters), Kanchenjunga (8,586 meters) and Anapurna (8,091 meters).
 Only mountaineer in the world to have climbed ten mountains of more than 8,000 meters after turning 60
 First person in the world to reach the peak of the Dome Khang (7,260 meters)
 Ascent of the 7 highest summits of 7 continents—a challenge that he completed when he was more than 70 years old: Elbrus (Europe-1968), McKinley (North America-1971), Aconcagua (South America-1986), Everest (Asia-2001), Mount Vinson (Antarctica- 2007), Carstensz (Oceania-2010) and Kilimanjaro (Africa-2010).

Awards 
 Silver Medal for Sporting Achievement, Spain's High Council of Sports, 2011
 National Award, Spanish Geographic Society
 Gold Medal, Peñalara Royal Society in 1991, 1994, 2000, 2002 and 2004.
 Silver Medal for Sporting Achievement, Madrid Regional Government
 Gold Medal, Spanish Mountaineering Federation, 1968, 1971 and 1975
 Sportsperson of the Year, Spanish Mountaineering Federation, 1976
 Sportsperson of the Year, Spanish Ski Federation, 1979
 Admittance into the Royal Order of Sports Achievement with a bronze medal presented by H.M., Juan Carlos I, King of Spain, in 2001

Interviews and features 
 
 
 “Al filo de lo imposible”, RTVE, December 2011
 El Pais newspaper, November 2011
 Cadena SER Radio, November 2011
 Vocento Group, October 2011
 Deia newspaper, November 2011

Documentaries

References

External links 

 Carlos Soria’s official YouTube page
 Carlos Soria’s official Facebook page
 

1939 births
Living people
Spanish mountain climbers
People from Ávila, Spain
Spanish summiters of Mount Everest